The Pacific Oceania Davis Cup team represents the island nations in Oceania, excluding Australia, New Zealand and New Caledonia, in Davis Cup tennis competition and are governed by the Oceania Tennis Federation.

Pacific Oceania on Sunday 19th September 2021 was promoted following the Davis Cup Tie in Amman, Jordan to compete in the 2022 Asia/Oceania Zone of Group II. In August 2022 they were promoted to World Group II.

Current team
Team representing Pacific Oceania vs.  at 2023 Davis Cup World Group II Play-offs from 3-4 February 2023
  Colin Sinclair
  Clement Mainguy
  Gillian Osmont
  Matavao Fanguna
  Brett Baudinet

History
Pacific Oceania competed in its first Davis Cup in 1995.

Nations and Territories represented

Former squad members
Active single players listed in bold and active double players listed also in italic

See also
Davis Cup
Pacific Oceania Fed Cup team

References

External links

Davis Cup teams
Tennis in Oceania
Tennis in Fiji
Tennis in the Marshall Islands
Tennis in Nauru
 
Sports clubs established in 1995
1995 establishments in Oceania